Perikhali Union is a Union Parishad under Rampal Upazila of Bagerhat District in the division of Khulna, Bangladesh. It has an area of 135.97 km2 (52.50 sq mi) and a population of 17,616.

References

Unions of Rampal Upazila
Unions of Bagerhat District
Unions of Khulna Division